Gortsaranain is a Yerevan Metro station. It was opened to the public on 11 June 1983.

References

Yerevan Metro stations
Railway stations opened in 1983
1983 establishments in the Soviet Union